The Babine Range is a small subrange of the Skeena Mountains of the Interior Mountains, located between Babine Lake, Babine River, Bulkey River and Skeena River in northern British Columbia, Canada.

Mountains
Mountains within the Babine Range include:

Mount Thomlinson
Sidina Mountain
Mount Thoen
Nine Mile Mountain
Netalzul Mountain
Mount Seaton
Mount Cronin

References

Babine Range in the Canadian Mountain Encyclopedia

Skeena Mountains